A hive mind or group mind may refer to:

Shared intelligence 
 Collective consciousness or collective intelligence, concepts in sociology and philosophy
 Group mind (science fiction), a type of collective consciousness
 Groupthink, in which the desire for harmony or conformity in a group results in irrational or dysfunctional decision-making
 Sheeple, a derogatory term referring to groups of people who ‘mindlessly’ follow those in power
 Swarm intelligence, the collective behavior of decentralized, self-organized systems, natural or artificial
 The apparent consciousness of colonies of social insects such as ants, bees, and termites
 Universal mind, a type of universal higher consciousness in some esoteric beliefs
 Egregore, a concept in occultism which has been described as group mind

Media
 Hive Mind (book), a 2015 nonfiction book by Garett Jones
 Hive Mind (The Internet album), 2018
 Hive Mind (Sinch album), 2012
 "Hive Mind", a 2013 song by They Might Be Giants from Nanobots
 "Hive Mind", a 2016 song by Circle of Dust from Machines of Our Disgrace
 "Hive Mind", a 2017 song by Blanck Mass from World Eater
 "Hive Mind", a 2021 song by Tirzah from Colourgrade
 "Hivemind", a 2012 song by To Speak of Wolves from Find Your Worth, Come Home
 "Hivemind", a 2022 song by Slipknot from The End, So Far
 HiveMind, a video game that was planned but never released by Will Wright
 Apache HiveMind, a software framework
 Hive Minds, a BBC4 quiz-show started in 2015 and hosted by Fiona Bruce

See also 
Mind Hive, a 2020 album by art punk band Wire
 Intentionality
 The Group Mind, a book by William McDougall
 Crowdsourcing

 Reddit